Darryl "Flea" Virostko (born December 25, 1971) is a professional "big wave" surfer from Santa Cruz, California.  He graduated from Santa Cruz High School in 1991.  He is a three-time Mavericks competition winner.  Virostko appears as himself in the surfing films Riding Giants, Step Into Liquid, and Billabong Odyssey.  Surfer declared his 2004 wipeout on a 50-foot wave at Waimea Bay, Hawaii, the "Wipeout of the Decade".

As of 2009 Virostko is a recovering addict, and runs a program, "FleaHab", to teach other recovering addicts how to surf and be active while learning a new way of life.  He starred in The Westsiders a documentary film by Josh Pomer that chronicles his difficult upbringing and addiction to drugs, on the west side of Santa Cruz.

Wendy Edwards collided with Darryl in a 'Bizzare' motor vehicle crash while driving highway 1 northbound On January 10,2022. Wendy fled the scene of the accident and jumped off a 300 ft. cliff into the ocean resulting in her death.

References 
 
 
 Darryl Virostko filmography on go.com
 https://www.ksbw.com/article/santa-cruz-ocean-jump-scotts-creek-surfing-flea/38740759

Notes 

1971 births
Living people
American surfers
Big wave surfing
Sportspeople from Santa Cruz, California
Big wave surfers

Santa Cruz High School alumni